is a former Japanese football player and manager.

Playing career
Kobayashi was born in Ibaraki Prefecture on March 17, 1959. After graduating from Chuo University, he played in the Japan Soccer League for Furukawa Electric from 1981 to 1989.

Coaching career
Kobayashi began his soccer coaching career in 1990 as manager of new club ALO's Hokuriku, which he coached through 1998 leading the team to promotion in the league. He then coached for the second half of 2001 for J2 League club Kawasaki Frontale and the first 20 games of the 2002 season for Mito HollyHock before becoming Mito's general manager. He was the president of Mito HollyHock from 2002 to 2007.

Managerial statistics

References

External links 

1959 births
Living people
Chuo University alumni
Association football people from Ibaraki Prefecture
Japanese footballers
Japan Soccer League players
JEF United Chiba players
Japanese football managers
J1 League managers
J2 League managers
Kawasaki Frontale managers
Mito HollyHock managers
Association football defenders
Japanese football chairmen and investors